Loranzè is a comune (municipality) in the Metropolitan City of Turin in the Italian region Piedmont, located about  north of Turin.

Loranzè borders the following municipalities: Fiorano Canavese, Salerano Canavese, Samone, Val di Chy, Colleretto Giacosa, and Parella.

References

Cities and towns in Piedmont